Mohamed Amrin bin Mohamed Amin is a Singaporean solicitor, lawyer and politician. A member of the governing People's Action Party (PAP), he was the Member of Parliament (MP) representing the Woodlands ward of Sembawang GRC between 2015 and 2020. 

He served as Senior Parliamentary Secretary for Home Affairs and Senior Parliamentary Secretary for Health concurrently between 2018 and 2020, Parliamentary Secretary for Home Affairs between 2015 and 2018, and Parliamentary Secretary for Health between 2017 and 2018.

During the 2020 general election, he contested in the newly-formed Sengkang GRC as part of a four-member PAP team, led by Minister in the Prime Minister's Office Ng Chee Meng, but failed to get elected after losing to the opposition Workers' Party team led by He Ting Ru.

Education
Amrin attended Griffiths Primary School (now Angsana Primary School), Dunman Secondary School and Tampines Junior College before graduating from the National University of Singapore with a Bachelor of Laws degree.

He subsequently went on to complete a Master of Laws degree at Columbia University.

Career
Amrin was a solicitor at Watson, Farley & Williams Asia Practice LLP, and was also a member of National Council on Problem Gambling as well as the governing board of Nanyang Polytechnic. 

He was a partner at the corporate practice of Joseph Tan Jude Benny LLP between July and October 2015.

After his electoral defeat in Sengkang GRC during the 2020 general election, Amrin moved to the technology sector, and took up roles at two local firms in September 2020. He was appointed Strategy Director at robotics and automation firm Platform for Bots and Automation (PBA), and concurrently assumed a non-executive adviser position at ADERA Global, a company involved in data-security, artificial intelligence (AI), and automation.

Political career
Amrin became a PAP activist in Sembawang GRC soon after the 2011 general election. He made his political debut in the 2015 general election as part of a four-member PAP team contesting in Sembawang GRC and won. He was subsequently appointed as Parliamentary Secretary for Home Affairs. During a Cabinet-reshuffle in 2015, he was appointed as Parliamentary Secretary for Health.

During the 2020 general election, Amrin contested in the newly-created Sengkang GRC as part of a four-member PAP team and lost. He became the third PAP MP to lose re-election after a single term in Parliament, joining Ng Pock Too and Seet Ai Mee. This was the second instance of the PAP losing a GRC to the Opposition, since their loss in 2011 to the Worker's Party in Aljunied GRC.

After his election loss, Amrin continued to serve in Sengkang GRC as an unelected representative of the PAP between 2020 to 2022. In March 2022, Amrin passed his position as PAP branch chair of Sengkang Central on to Dr Elmie Nekmat, but is officially still on PAP's Sengkang GRC team.

References

External links
 
Amrin Amin on Instagram

1978 births
People's Action Party politicians
Singaporean people of Malay descent
Singaporean Muslims
Living people